Martin Šroler (born 2 November 1998) is a Croatian professional footballer who plays as an attacking midfielder or winger for Slovenian PrvaLiga club NŠ Mura.

Club career
On 23 May 2022, Šroler signed a contract with NŠ Mura until the summer of 2025.

References

External links

1998 births
Living people
Footballers from Zagreb
Association football midfielders
Croatian footballers
FC Koper players
HNK Gorica players
NK Sesvete players
NK Inter Zaprešić players
NK Aluminij players
NŠ Mura players
Slovenian PrvaLiga players
Croatian Football League players
First Football League (Croatia) players
Croatian expatriate footballers
Expatriate footballers in Slovenia
Croatian expatriate sportspeople in Slovenia